Danilo Luiz da Silva (born 15 July 1991), known as Danilo, is a Brazilian professional footballer who plays primarily as a right-back for  club Juventus and the Brazil national team.

Danilo began his career with América Mineiro before moving to Santos, where he scored the goal that won the 2011 Copa Libertadores. In January 2012, he moved to Portuguese club Porto, where he won consecutive Primeira Liga titles. In 2015, he joined Real Madrid following a €31.5 million transfer fee. In 2017, he joined Manchester City. In 2019, having won two Premier League titles, an FA Cup and two EFL Cups with City, Danilo joined Juventus, winning the Serie A title during his first season with the club.

Danilo was first capped by the senior Brazil team in 2011, also winning the 2011 U-20 World Cup and a silver medal at the 2012 Summer Olympics. He represented the nation at the 2018 FIFA World Cup, the 2021 Copa América and the 2022 World Cup.

Club career

Early years & Santos
Danilo was born in Bicas, Minas Gerais. He played youth football with Tupynambás and América Mineiro, and competed at senior level with the latter club in the Campeonato Mineiro and the Série C, winning the latter in 2009 and gaining promotion.

In May 2010, Danilo was transferred to Santos. Investor DIS Esporte acquired 37.5% of his economic rights, Santos another 37.5% for free and the remaining 25% were retained by América. He won the Campeonato Paulista in 2011 and competed in two Série A seasons with the team.

Danilo played the full 90 minutes of both legs of the 2011 Copa Libertadores Finals against Peñarol, the first in central midfield and the second at right-back, and scored the decisive goal in a 2–1 victory following a goalless first match.

Porto

In early January 2012, following the 2011 FIFA Club World Cup, Danilo signed for Portuguese club Porto on a contract lasting until June 2016 following a €13 million transfer fee paid by Porto. His contract included a €50 million release clause. He initially played understudy to Cristian Săpunaru, but soon became first choice, with compatriot Alex Sandro – who signed at the same time – featuring on the other defensive wing as the Vítor Pereira-led team won back-to-back Primeira Liga titles.

Danilo scored his fourth competitive goal of the 2014–15 season on 18 February with a penalty kick to equalise at 1–1 away to Basel in the Champions League round of 16.

Real Madrid
On 31 March 2015, it was announced that Danilo would join Real Madrid in July, with the Spaniards paying a €31.5 million transfer fee for his services and signing him to a six-year contract. He made his debut on 23 August in a goalless draw at Sporting Gijón, which was also the season opener. On 24 October, he scored his first goal for the team, in a 3–1 away win against Celta de Vigo.

Danilo contributed with seven appearances in the 2015–16 edition of the Champions League as Real Madrid won the tournament. In the final against Atlético Madrid, he came on as a substitute for injured Dani Carvajal early into the second half of a 1–1 draw and penalty shootout triumph.

In 2016–17, profiting from several physical ailments to Carvajal, Danilo contributed with 17 matches and one goal as the club was crowned La Liga champions for the first time in five years. He also played in three matches in the club's Champions League campaign, helping Madrid win its second consecutive Champions League title.

Manchester City

On 23 July 2017, Danilo signed for English Premier League club Manchester City on a five-year contract for a reported £26.5 million transfer fee. He scored his first goal for his new team on 23 December, replacing Fabian Delph late into the home fixture against AFC Bournemouth and scoring the final goal of a 4–0 home win.

Juventus
On 7 August 2019, Danilo signed for Serie A champions Juventus on a five-year contract following a €37 million transfer fee paid by Juventus. The transaction involved a part-exchange that saw João Cancelo move to Manchester City. Danilo made his Juventus debut on 31 August in a match against Napoli, in which he scored the opening goal of an eventual 4–3 home victory, which was also the fastest goal scored by a foreign player in Serie A.

In the 2020 Coppa Italia Final against Napoli on 17 June, following a 0–0 draw after regulation time, Danilo missed Juventus' second spot kick in the resulting shoot-out, hitting the ball over the crossbar. Napoli ultimately won the match 4–2 on penalties.

On 10 January 2021, in a Serie A game against Sassuolo, Danilo opened the scoring with a 25-meter goal; Juventus won 3–1.

International career

Courtesy of his Santos performances, Danilo made his debut for Brazil on 14 September 2011 at the age of just 20, featuring in the first leg of that year's Superclásico de las Américas, a 0–0 away draw against Argentina (2–0 aggregate win). In the same year, he started for the under-20s at the FIFA U-20 World Cup, with the tournament in Colombia ending in victory.

Danilo represented the under-23 team at the 2012 Summer Olympics. He played four matches in Brazil's journey to the silver medal, scoring against New Zealand in the group stage (3–0).

Danilo was also named in Tite's squad for the 2018 FIFA World Cup in Russia, making his debut in the competition on 17 June by playing the entire 1–1 draw to Switzerland. He incurred an injury on 6 July the day before the quarter-final clash with Belgium, being sidelined for the remainder of the tournament.

Danilo scored his first senior international goal on 19 November 2019 in a 3–0 friendly win against South Korea played in Abu Dhabi.

In June 2021, he was included in Brazil's squad for the 2021 Copa América on home soil. He started in his nation's 1–0 defeat to rivals Argentina in the final on 10 July.

On 7 November 2022, Danilo was named in the squad for the 2022 FIFA World Cup. During the opening game against Serbia, Danilo injured his ankle, forcing him to skip the rest of the group stage.

Style of play
In 2012, Marca compared Danilo to compatriot and fellow right-back Dani Alves, describing him as "a tireless right back with an attacking streak and a polished technique. His continual runs up and down the flank also serve to make him a tough defender, who plays well as a sweeper and anticipates the play. He measures 6 feet tall and, in spite of his slender build, does well up top," also dubbing him as being "one of the best right backs of the future," due to his high quality performances at the time. Although primarily a right-back, he has also been deployed as a right-winger, or even as a central or defensive midfielder in front of the back-line on occasion. In 2015, Tim Vickery, an expert on South American football, said the following of Danilo: "From Carlos Alberto to Cafu, Brazil have had more spectacular players at right-back than most - but Porto man Danilo is proving a splendid all-rounder. He can join the attack as an element of surprise, but his defensive skills are also sound." Under his Juventus manager Maurizio Sarri, Danilo has also been used as a makeshift left-back. A 2019 profile in Tuttosport by Giovanni Aramini also praised him for his tactical sense, positioning, and ball-winning capabilities, describing him as a "complete" defender. Under Andrea Pirlo, he has also been used as a right-sided centre-back in a three-man back-line.

Career statistics

Club

International

Scores and results list Brazil's goal tally first.

Honours
América Mineiro
Campeonato Brasileiro Série C: 2009

Santos
Campeonato Paulista: 2011
Copa Libertadores: 2011

Porto
Primeira Liga: 2011–12, 2012–13

Real Madrid
La Liga: 2016–17
UEFA Champions League: 2015–16, 2016–17
UEFA Super Cup: 2016
FIFA Club World Cup: 2016

Manchester City
Premier League: 2017–18, 2018–19
FA Cup: 2018–19
EFL Cup: 2017–18, 2018–19

Juventus
Serie A: 2019–20
Coppa Italia: 2020–21
Supercoppa Italiana: 2020

Brazil
South American U-20 Championship: 2011
FIFA U-20 World Cup: 2011
Superclásico de las Américas: 2011, 2014
Summer Olympic Games Silver medal: 2012

Individual
Campeonato Mineiro Best Newcomer: 2010

References

External links

Profile at the Juventus F.C. website

1991 births
Living people
Sportspeople from Minas Gerais
Brazilian footballers
Association football defenders
América Futebol Clube (MG) players
Santos FC players
FC Porto players
Real Madrid CF players
Manchester City F.C. players
Juventus F.C. players
Campeonato Brasileiro Série C players
Campeonato Brasileiro Série B players
Campeonato Brasileiro Série A players
Primeira Liga players
La Liga players
Premier League players
Serie A players
Copa Libertadores-winning players
UEFA Champions League winning players
Brazil youth international footballers
Brazil under-20 international footballers
Olympic footballers of Brazil
Brazil international footballers
Footballers at the 2012 Summer Olympics
2018 FIFA World Cup players
2021 Copa América players
2022 FIFA World Cup players
Olympic medalists in football
Olympic silver medalists for Brazil
Medalists at the 2012 Summer Olympics
Brazilian expatriate footballers
Brazilian expatriate sportspeople in Portugal
Brazilian expatriate sportspeople in Spain
Brazilian expatriate sportspeople in England
Brazilian expatriate sportspeople in Italy
Expatriate footballers in Portugal
Expatriate footballers in Spain
Expatriate footballers in England
Expatriate footballers in Italy